Les Eldering (18 January 1938 – 26 January 2003) was an Australian rules footballer who played with St Kilda in the Victorian Football League (VFL).

Eldering played his early football at amateur club Commonwealth Bank and represented the Australian Amateurs at the 1958 Melbourne Carnival. In the 1960 VFL season, Eldering made eight appearances for St Kilda, as a ruckman. He injured his knee in a 1961 practice match when he landed on a sprinkler hole and wouldn't play again for St Kilda.

References

1938 births
Australian rules footballers from Victoria (Australia)
St Kilda Football Club players
2003 deaths